Zhu Qinan (born November 15, 1984, in Wenzhou, Zhejiang) is a male Chinese sport shooter. He won the gold medal at the 2004 Athens Olympics in the Men's 10 m Air Rifle event and a silver medal at the 2008 Beijing Olympics in the Men's 10 m Air Rifle event. Zhu currently is studying at Zhejiang University.

Zhu began shooting training at Wenzhou Sports School in 1999. From there, in February 2002, he joined the Zhejiang province shooting team. Zhu joined the national shooting team on December 14, 2003. At the time of his Olympic victory, he was still a junior, and his qualification round score of 599 was an equalled junior world record. He repeated this achievement at the 2004 ISSF World Cup Final in Bangkok, which he also won. He has since then won several ISSF World Cup competitions in 10 m Air Rifle.
On September 22, 2011, Zhu shot a perfect 600 in the qualification round. He scored 103.8 in the final round making a total score of 703.8 to gain the 10 m Air Rifle final world record.
His best result in 50 m Rifle is a bronze medal from the 2004 Asian Championships. Zhu is 5'11" tall and weighs 148 pounds. At the 51st ISSF World Championship held in Granada, Spain, Zhu got gold medal in 50m Rifle 3 Positions.

World record

References

External links
 
 

1984 births
Living people
Chinese male sport shooters
ISSF rifle shooters
Olympic gold medalists for China
Olympic shooters of China
Olympic silver medalists for China
Sportspeople from Wenzhou
Shooters at the 2004 Summer Olympics
Shooters at the 2008 Summer Olympics
Shooters at the 2012 Summer Olympics
Shooters at the 2016 Summer Olympics
World record holders in shooting
Zhejiang University alumni
Asian Games medalists in shooting
Olympic medalists in shooting
Sport shooters from Zhejiang
Medalists at the 2008 Summer Olympics
Medalists at the 2004 Summer Olympics
Shooters at the 2006 Asian Games
Shooters at the 2010 Asian Games
Shooters at the 2014 Asian Games
Asian Games gold medalists for China
Asian Games silver medalists for China
Asian Games bronze medalists for China
Medalists at the 2006 Asian Games
Medalists at the 2010 Asian Games
Medalists at the 2014 Asian Games
21st-century Chinese people